Newport Railroad Station was a historic railway station located at Newport in New Castle County, Delaware.  It was built about 1908 and was a 44 feet, 4 inches, long, one-story frame building in the Bungalow / American Craftsman style.  It had a large overhanging hipped roof with exposed rafter ends.  It was built by the Philadelphia, Wilmington and Baltimore Railroad and closed in the late 1940s.  It was demolished between 1995 and 2002.

It was added to the National Register of Historic Places in 1994. A transportation study considered the location for a new commuter rail station along SEPTA Regional Rail's Wilmington/Newark Line during the mid-1990s.

References

Railway stations on the National Register of Historic Places in Delaware
Railway stations in the United States opened in 1908
Buildings and structures in New Castle County, Delaware
Former Pennsylvania Railroad stations
National Register of Historic Places in New Castle County, Delaware
1908 establishments in Delaware
Former railway stations in Delaware